The following article lists the squad members of the participating national teams in the 2012 CECAFA Cup, the 36th edition of the CECAFA Cup.

Group A

Ethiopia

Head coach:  Seyum Kebede

Source:

Kenya
Midfielders Paul Were and Kevin Omondi were dismissed from the squad for leaving the team's hotel on the night of 27 November 2012 and not returning until dawn the next morning. A.F.C. Leopards players Bernard Mang'oli and Victor Ochieng were called in as replacements for the two players. However, they were called back to the squad ahead of their semi-final match against Zanzibar due to injuries aggravated by their replacements, Mang'oli and Ochieng.

Head coach:  James Nandwa (acting)

South Sudan
Head coach:  Zoran Đorđević

Uganda

Head coach:  Bobby Williamson

Group B

Burundi
Coach:  Lofty Naseem

Source:

Somalia

Head coach:  Sam Ssimbwa

Source:

Sudan

Head coach:

Tanzania
Head coach:  Kim Poulsen

Group C

Eritrea
Head coach: Negash Teklit

Malawi

Head coach:  Kinnah Phiri

Rwanda

Head coach:  Milutin Sredojević

Zanzibar

Head coach:  Salum Nassor

References

squads